Condemned is a Spanish 1953 rural melodrama film directed by Manuel Mur Oti and written by José Suárez Carreño and Mur Oti from a Suarez Carreño's play of the same title. The picture stars Carlos Lemos, Aurora Bautista and José Suárez.

Plot
An aging and wealthy farmer (Lemos) sees how his young wife (Bautista) falls increasingly attracted to a newly hired and handsome laborer (Suarez). The conflict ends up unavoidably in a murder of passion.

Cast 
 Aurora Bautista as Aurelia
 Carlos Lemos as José
 José Suárez as Juan
 Félix Fernández as Tabernero
 

Carlos Lemos was a very prominent stage actor, and this was one of his few film appearances. Aurora Bautista was by then the Spanish Queen of melodrama, while José Suárez was one of the main heartthrobs of the Spanish screens.

References

Bibliography 
 Bentley, Bernard. A Companion to Spanish Cinema. Boydell & Brewer 2008.

External links

1953 films
Films directed by Manuel Mur Oti
Spanish drama films
1953 drama films
Spanish black-and-white films
Melodrama films
Cifesa films
1950s Spanish films